Dohnányi is a Hungarian family name belonging to a notable family of politicians and musicians related to composer Ernő Dohnányi.

Frederick Dohnányi (1843–1909), Hungarian professor of mathematics and amateur cellist; father of Ernő Dohnányi
Ernő Dohnányi, also known as Ernst von Dohnányi (1877–1960), Hungarian pianist, conductor and composer
Hans von Dohnanyi (1902–1945), son of Ernő; German jurist and resistance fighter against the Third Reich
Klaus von Dohnanyi (born 1928), son of Hans; German politician, mayor of Hamburg
Christoph von Dohnányi (born 1929), son of Hans; German conductor
Justus von Dohnányi (born 1960), son of Christoph; German actor
Oliver von Dohnányi (born 1955), Slovak conductor, descended from a brother of an eighteenth-century ancestor of Ernő